"You Got Me Hummin'" (also known as "You've Got Me Hummin'") is a popular song written by Isaac Hayes and David Porter.  It was first popularized by Sam & Dave, who had a Top 10 R&B hit with the song in 1966 on Stax Records. It was subsequently covered by Cold Blood who had greater success with the song on the American pop charts.  Additionally, the song has been recorded by the Pointer Sisters, Reigning Sound, Freddie Fender and Delbert McClinton as well as J. Blackfoot.  Billy Joel released the song several times: first in 1967, when in the band The Hassles and under the title "You've Got Me Hummin'  and in 1983 (live version, on the B-side of the 12" of "Tell Her About It" under the title "You Got Me Hummin'".)

Selected recording history

Charts

References

External links
Allmusic

Sam & Dave songs
Songs written by Isaac Hayes
1966 singles
Rhythm and blues songs
Male vocal duets
Songs written by David Porter (musician)
1966 songs
Stax Records singles
Atlantic Records singles